MySIPSwitch is a Voice over IP (VoIP) open-source software under BSD licence and a free service.

MySIPSwitch
MySIPSwitch is an experimental stateful SIP Proxy server sponsored by Blue Face to allow the use of multiple supplier SIP accounts from a single SIP login. It basically means that you can use many SIP accounts with a single piece of hardware (IP Phone, ATA or softphone).

The service is based on a dial plan (written either in Asterisk-like syntax or in Ruby). This dial plan allows routing of inbound and outbound calls depending on the parameters you want : call prefix, time of the day, availability … You can fork an incoming call to various end points, you can forward the call to a second or third end point if the first ones are not responding, you can block calls, you can create a speed dial directory (for instance if you press *1 or *2 …, it automatically dials, the number you specified …). On top of these call management features you have various debugging tools that allow playing with and testing the service.

MySIPSwitch also allows the handling of  SIP phone calls from web browsers: hangup, transfer, forward, hold and resume. It is possible to take an incoming call from one provider and forward it onto another provider without having to have a device registered. This makes it possible to receive a call without the need for a VoIP device at all.

MySIPSwitch has a user discussion forum  allowing developers to improve it according to the feedback from users.
The development language is C#, the database environment is PostgreSQL and the interface is a website.

See also

Voice over IP
SIP

References

External links
http://sipsorcery.codeplex.com/

VoIP software
Free VoIP software
VoIP services
Telephony
Software using the BSD license